Chilostomelloidea is a superfamily of foraminifera in the order Rotaliida. They are found in sediments of Early Cretaceous (Barremian) to the present.

The test, or shell, may be trochospiral to planispiral throughout, or just in the early part with the later part uncoiled. Chambers may be somewhat enveloping, and attached forms may uncoil in the adult. In coiled forms, the aperture is interiomarginal, or terminal in uncoiled forms. The test wall is made of optically granular perforate hyaline (glassy) oblique calcite.

Subtaxa
The superfamily Chilostomelloidea consists of the following families:

References

Foraminifera superfamilies
Rotaliida